André Émile Oriol (26 May 1902 – 17 April 1994) was a French rower. He competed in the men's eight event at the 1924 Summer Olympics alongside his brother Fernand.

References

External links
 

1902 births
1994 deaths
French male rowers
Olympic rowers of France
Rowers at the 1924 Summer Olympics
Rowers from Paris